Jim Main (1943 – August 2022) was an Australian sports journalist and writer. He is known especially for his coverage of Australian rules football.

He studied law at the University of Melbourne and later graduated from La Trobe University with a bachelor of arts degree.

Main worked at the Melbourne Herald and later on London's Daily Express. He was later sports editor of The Australian for more than 10 years.

He covered several Commonwealth Games and Olympic Games and won a Walkley Award for his coverage of the 1970 Commonwealth Games in Edinburgh. 

Main was inducted into the Melbourne Cricket Ground Media Hall of Fame in 2003.

He has published more than 60 books and has co-written books with David Allen, Eddie McGuire and Jim Stynes.

He was also a notable supporter and historian of the Sydney Swans.

Bibliography
Hanged - Execution in Australia, 2007, BAS Publishing, Seaford Vic, 
The Encyclopedia of AFL Footballers with Russell Holmesby (1st:1998, 9th:2011-1000 pages) BAS Publishing, 
Aussie Rules For Dummies (2008) For Dummies, .
 Harris, George with Main, Jim (2006), George - by George. Changi, the Blues and Beyond, Bas Publishing, Melbourne, Victoria.  (hbk.)

References

Australian rules football commentators
1943 births
2022 deaths
Melbourne Law School alumni
Walkley Award winners
La Trobe University alumni
Australian sports journalists
The Herald (Melbourne) people